Duchy of Saint Sava was a late medieval polity in southeastern Europe, that existed from 1448 up to 1482, when it was absorbed by the Ottoman Empire. It was ruled by the Kosača noble family, who held the title "Duke of Saint Sava". Their domains included southern parts of modern-day Bosnia and Herzegovina, extending to southern parts of modern-day coastal Croatia, northwestern Montenegro and southwestern Serbia. Its founder, Stjepan Vukčić Kosača (duke since 1448), titled himself Herceg of Saint Sava, a title which would later give rise to the new name to the region: Herzegovina, and will be also used by the Ottomans as Hersek Sancağı (Sanjak of the Herzeg), designating the Sanjak of Herzegovina.

In English historiography, forms such as the "Duchy of Saint Sava" or "Duchy of St. Sava" were used since the 19th century.

History

Until the 14th century, most regions of the later Duchy of Saint Sava were part of medieval Serbia, and then part of the medieval Bosnia, that reached its high under Stephen Tvrtko I (d. 1391), king of Serbs, Bosnia and Maritime. At its greatest extent, under Stjepan Vukčić Kosača, and later his son Vladislav, the Kosača noble family ruled the territories that included significant part of modern-day Bosnia and Herzegovina, and extended to parts of modern-day coastal Croatia, northwestern Montenegro and southeastern part of modern Serbia. Stjepan titled himself "Herceg of Saint Sava", after the first Serbian Archbishop, Saint Sava. The title is of German origin, Herzog ("Duke"), and it was used as an equivalent to the South Slavic title Vojvoda. Stjepan's title of Duke (Herceg) would later give the name to the present-day region of Herzegovina, as the Ottomans used the term "Hersek Sancağı" (Sanjak of the Herzeg) for the newly formed Sanjak of Herzegovina.

On 15 February 1444, Stephen signed a treaty with Alfonso V, King of Aragon and Naples, becoming his vassal in exchange for the king's help against Stjepan's enemies, namely King Stephen Thomas of Bosnia, Duke Ivaniš Pavlović and the Republic of Venice. In the same treaty Stjepan promised to pay regular tribute to Alfonso instead of his tribute to the Ottoman sultan, which he had done up until then. In a document sent to Holy Roman Emperor Frederick III on 20 January 1448, Stephen Vukčić Kosača styled himself "Vojvoda (duke, herzog) of Saint Sava", "Lord of Hum and the Coast", and "Grand Duke", and forced the Bosnian king to recognize him as such. The title "Duke of Saint Sava" had considerable public relations value, because Sava's relics, which were located in Mileševa, were considered miracle-working by people of all Christian faiths in the region. This significantly improved relations between Stjepan and the Serbian Despot Đurađ Branković, as they formed an alliance the same year and conquered Višegrad and Srebrnica from the Bosnian crown.

In 1451, Stjepan attacked Dubrovnik, and laid siege to the city. He had earlier been made a Ragusan nobleman and, consequently, the Ragusan government now proclaimed him a traitor. A reward of 15,000 ducats, a palace in Dubrovnik worth 2,000 ducats, and an annual income of 300 ducats was offered to anyone who would kill him, along with the promise of hereditary Ragusan nobility which also helped hold this promise to whoever did the deed. Stjepan was so scared by the threat that he finally raised the siege.

Stjepan Vukčić died in 1466, and was succeeded by his eldest son Vladislav Hercegović. In 1482 he was overpowered by Ottoman forces led by Stjepan Vukčić's youngest son, Hersekli Ahmed Pasha, who converted to Islam prior to that. In the Ottoman Empire, Herzegovina was organized as a part (sanjak) within the province (pashaluk) of Bosnia. Stjepan founded the Serbian Orthodox Zagrađe Monastery near his realm's seat in Soko, modern-day northwestern Montenegro, and the Savina Monastery, near Herceg Novi in the Bay of Kotor. Their successors kept the title "Duke of Saint Sava" and used it until the extinction of Kosača family.

Rulers
 Stjepan Vukčić Kosača, 1435–1466
 Vladislav Hercegović and Vlatko Hercegović, 1466–1482
 Balša Hercegović (in title)

See also
 Zachlumia
 Old Herzegovina
 Ottoman conquest of Bosnia

References

Sources

External links
 

Historical counties of Bosnia and Herzegovina
Kingdom of Bosnia
Medieval Herzegovina
Ottoman period in the history of Bosnia and Herzegovina
15th century in the Ottoman Empire
1448 establishments in Europe
1482 disestablishments in Europe
States and territories disestablished in the 1440s
States and territories disestablished in the 1480s